Ralph Lee Abraham Jr. (born September 16, 1954) is an American veterinarian, physician, and politician who served as the U.S. representative for  from 2015 to 2021. A member of the Republican Party, he is a native and resident of Alto, Louisiana.

Abraham ran for governor of Louisiana in 2019, but failed to advance to the runoff. On February 26, 2020, he announced that he would not run for reelection to Congress in 2020.

Early life, education, and career
Abraham is the son of Marlene Posey, a retired educator, and Ralph Abraham Sr. His paternal grandparents were emigrants from Lebanon.

He graduated from Louisiana State University School of Veterinary Medicine in 1980 and was a practicing veterinarian for ten years. He returned to Louisiana State University School of Medicine for a medical degree in 1994 and practiced family medicine.

Abraham has served in the United States Coast Guard Auxiliary and the Mississippi National Guard. He and his wife, Dianne, have three children. He has been an aviation medical examiner.

U.S. House of Representatives

Elections
2014

Abraham defeated his Democratic opponent, Mayor Jamie Mayo of Monroe, 134,612 votes (64.2%) to 75,004 (35.8%). He was sworn into office on January 3, 2015.

2016

In his bid for reelection, Abraham defeated one challenger, fellow Republican Billy Burkette of Baton Rouge, a former constable in East Feliciana Parish and former chairman of the Louisiana Band of Choctaw Indians. Burkette claimed in his campaign that the Environmental Protection Agency had issued overly strict regulations that hamper farming.

2018

Abraham defeated three challengers in 2018: Billy Burkette, an Independent from Pride, Louisiana; Jessee Carlton Fleenor, a Democrat from Loranger, and Kyle Randol, a Libertarian from Monroe. Abraham polled 149,010 votes (67%) to Fleenor's 67,113 votes (30%). Burkette and Randol received the remaining 3%.

Tenure
After his election, Abraham chose Luke Letlow, his campaign manager, as chief of staff.

In June 2017, Abraham co-sponsored the Civil Rights Uniformity Act of 2017.

In August 2017, Abraham endorsed President Donald Trump's nomination of Terry Doughty, also of Richland Parish, for a seat on the United States District Court for the Western District of Louisiana, based in Monroe. The selection also carried the backing of U.S. Senators Bill Cassidy and John Neely Kennedy.

In December 2017, Abraham voted for the Tax Cuts and Jobs Act. After voting, he said, "This is going to be a great tax bill, and great tax reform not only for Louisiana but for the United States." He said businesses would benefit greatly and be able to "reinvest in their infrastructure, reinvest in their employees", and that wages would increase and job opportunities grow.

In 2020, Abraham opted not to run for reelection, and endorsed Letlow in the election to succeed him. Letlow won the election, but died from COVID-19 complications a few days before he was scheduled to take office.

Committee assignments
 Committee on Agriculture
 Subcommittee on Conservation and Forestry
 Subcommittee on General Farm Commodities and Risk Management
 Committee on Science, Space and Technology
 Subcommittee on Space
 Subcommittee on Research and Technology
 Subcommittee on Oversight
 United States House Committee on Armed Services
 Subcommittee on Emerging Threats and Capabilities
 Subcommittee on Seapower and Projection Forces
 Subcommittee on Military Personnel

Caucus memberships
 Congressional Western Caucus
 Coast Guard Caucus
 Historic Preservation Caucus
 GOP Doctor's Caucus
 Mississippi River Caucus
 Congressional National Guard and Reserve Components Caucus
 National Guard Youth Challenge Caucus
 Congressional Sportsmen's Caucus
 Veteran's Caucus
 Veterinary Medicine Caucus
U.S.-Japan Caucus

Gubernatorial campaign
On December 6, 2018, Abraham declared his candidacy for governor of Louisiana in the 2019 Louisiana gubernatorial election. He placed third, behind fellow Republican Eddie Rispone and Democratic incumbent John Bel Edwards, failing to advance to the runoff required under Louisiana law as no candidate received a majority in the primary.

Political positions

Agriculture 

In March 2017, Abraham visited with about 70 farmers from the Louisiana Farm Bureau Federation, an agricultural lobby. He told them, "Food security is national security. Agriculture is at the forefront of the fight because any interruption in the food supply or a compromise in its safety goes right to the heart of the nation." Marty Wooldridge, a cattleman from Caddo Parish, said that Abraham's slogan "Food security is national security" should be incorporated into the Farm Bureau's slogan. Louisiana's only member on the House Agriculture Committee, Abraham saw his job in part as "educating members whose districts might be deeply metropolitan and who have no perspective on the importance of agriculture." In 2018, he was named to the conference committee for the 2018 Farm Bill. The conference committee resolves differences in the House and the Senate versions of the Farm Bill.

Health care 

Abraham believes the Affordable Care Act should be repealed. He opposes the expansion of Medicaid.

Economic issues 

Abraham supports simplifying the tax code.

He supports equal pay for women.

Energy policy 

Abraham is in favor of the Keystone Pipeline.

Immigration 

Regarding illegal immigration, Abraham opposed amnesty and supported strengthening border security. He supported Trump's 2017 executive order to temporarily halt immigration from seven specified nations until the development of more enhanced screening methods. His spokesman said, "Dr. Abraham generally supports President Trump's temporary suspension of the refugee and immigration admittance program. Dr. Abraham agrees with President Trump that we must take all necessary steps to protect American citizens from potential terrorism threats, and this temporary measure from the President will allow for a thorough review of our policies and procedures for vetting applicants from war-torn areas."

Abraham has said he supports banning sanctuary cities in Louisiana, and that he would pay for four minority congresswomen, three of whom were born in the U.S., to leave the United States, if they would tell him where they'd like to go, referencing Trump's "send them back" comments.

Death penalty
Abraham has said he supports the death penalty and as governor would find a way to resume executions in the state. He also wants to expand it to include child molesters.

Abortion 

Abraham opposes late term abortions. In May 2015, he said, "As a doctor, I know and I can attest that this bill is backed by scientific research showing that babies can indeed feel pain at 20 weeks, if not before".

Drug policy 

In 2016, Abraham had a "D" rating from marijuana legalization advocacy group NORML for his voting history regarding cannabis-related causes.

LGBT issues 

Abraham was "100 percent" opposed to transgender people serving in the military.

Texas v. Pennsylvania
In December 2020, Abraham was one of 126 Republican members of the House of Representatives to sign an amicus brief in support of Texas v. Pennsylvania, a lawsuit filed at the United States Supreme Court contesting the results of the 2020 presidential election, in which Joe Biden defeated Trump. The Supreme Court declined to hear the case on the basis that Texas lacked standing under Article III of the Constitution to challenge the results of an election held by another state.

Notes

See also
 List of Arab and Middle-Eastern Americans in the United States Congress

References

External links

 
 
 

1954 births
Living people
21st-century American politicians
American politicians of Lebanese descent
American veterinarians
Baptists from Louisiana
Louisiana State University alumni
Male veterinarians
Mississippi National Guard personnel
People from Mangham, Louisiana
Physicians from Louisiana
Politicians from Monroe, Louisiana
Protestants from Louisiana
Republican Party members of the United States House of Representatives from Louisiana
United States Coast Guard enlisted